Tramkar (Bulgarian: Трамкар) is a Bulgarian tram manufacturer based in Sofia. It repairs and renovates vehicles of the Sofia tram and trolleybus systems. Tramkar also manufactured trams and trolleybuses until 1991.

Trams 
The following list is incomplete.
Republika
Komsololets
Kosmonavt
T6M-801 Sofia 65
T8M-730 Sofia 70
T6M-400 Sofia 100
T8M-301 Bulgaria 1300
T8M-900
T8M-900M
 T6M-700
 T8M-700M
 T6MD - 1000
 T8K-503
 Inekon T8M-700IT

Trolleybuses 
The following list is incomplete.

 TB-51
 Tramkar Chavdar
 Guleruz Cobra
 Guleruz Cobra 272

References 

Tram manufacturers
Trolleybus manufacturers